Linköpings AIK is a sports club in Linköping, Sweden, established on 22 October 1908. The club runs orienteering, earlier even bandy and soccer. The men's bandy team played in the Swedish top division in 1931. and also reached three semifinals when the Swedish national championship was played as a knockout-tournament back in the 1920s.

The men's soccer team played in the Swedish third division during the seasons of 1928–1929 and 1929–1930.

History
In the first year of bandy league system in Sweden, 1930–31, Linköping entered in Division 1 Södra together with
Djurgårdens IF, IF Göta, IFK Strängnäs, IFK Uppsala, IK Göta, Nässjö IF, and Örebro SK and finished 7th.

References

External links
Official website 

1908 establishments in Sweden
Defunct bandy clubs in Sweden
Defunct football clubs in Sweden
Orienteering clubs in Sweden
Sports clubs established in 1908
Bandy clubs established in 1908
Sport in Linköping